Michael Dorf may refer to:
 Michael C. Dorf, American law professor
 Michael Dorf (entrepreneur), American entrepreneur

See also 
 Michael Dorff, mathematician
 Dorf (disambiguation)